Kasba Lake is a lake in the northern Canadian wilderness.  The majority of the lake lies within the Northwest Territories, but a small section is in Nunavut.  The lake is close to Canada's four corners.  A seasonal fishing lodge is open to tourists each summer.

See also

Kasba Lake Airport
Kasba Lake Water Aerodrome
List of lakes in the Northwest Territories
List of lakes of Canada

References

Lakes of the Northwest Territories
Lakes of Kivalliq Region
Borders of the Northwest Territories
Borders of Nunavut